Thomas Michael Oar (born 10 December 1991) is a retired Australian professional footballer who played as a midfielder. 

Born on the Gold Coast, Queensland, Oar played youth football for Burleigh Heads, Palm Beach and at the Queensland Academy of Sport before making his professional debut for Brisbane Roar in 2008. He joined Dutch club FC Utrecht in 2010, making over 100 appearances for the side before moving to England to play for Ipswich Town in 2015. He later joined Cypriot giants Apoel Nicosia, before returning to the A-League. 

Oar has twenty eight caps with the Australian national team, scoring two goals. He participated in the 2014 FIFA World Cup and the 2011 and 2015 Asian Cups, with Australia winning the latter. He was part of the Australia U-20 side at the 2009 and 2011 FIFA U-20 World Cups, winning Goal of the tournament in 2011. He also attended the 2010 FIFA World Cup at just 18 years old, although did not take to the field.

Early life
Oar's paternal grandparents have Basque heritage.

Oar attended All Saints Anglican School on the Gold Coast graduating in 2008. Oar previously played at Palm Beach Sharks football club on the Gold Coast and eventually the Queensland Academy of Sport, where he was picked by Brisbane Roar.

Club career

Queensland Roar
Oar signed a three-year contract with Queensland Roar ahead of the 2008–09 A-League. He made his A-League debut for the side on 14 December 2008, coming on in the 73rd minute of a late 2–1 win over Newcastle Jets. In his second A-League appearance, on 28 December 2008, Oar scored a late free kick to secure a win over Wellington Phoenix.

Oar won the A-League Young Footballer of the Year award for the 2009–10 A-League.

FC Utrecht
In January 2010, Oar signed with Dutch agent Rob Jansen and was linked with a move at the end of the 2009–10 season to Eredivisie squad Feyenoord Rotterdam and trained with FC Utrecht with fellow Roar players, Michael Zullo and Adam Sarota.

In March 2010 he was award the Rising Star award for the Best Young Player and selected in the A-League Team of the Year. On 2 April 2010 he, along with fellow Roar players Michael Zullo and Adam Sarota, joined FC Utrecht on a five-year deal, in a collective transfer deal said to be worth in excess of A$1.8 million. In December 2010 he made his European debut in a Europa League game against Liverpool FC at Anfield.

In the 2012–13 Eredivisie season Oar played every game in FC Utrecht's most successful season as they finished with 63 points and qualified for the Europa League. He was awarded 10th place in the Voetbal International Eredivisie player of the Year standings and was linked with clubs such as Benfica and Celtic F.C.

Ipswich Town
On 29 August 2015, it was announced Oar had signed a two-year contract with Championship side Ipswich Town. He made his debut for Ipswich in September 2015, starting in a loss to Manchester United in the League Cup. After a further substitute appearance against Blackburn Rovers in the Championship, Oar made his starting debut for Ipswich against Huddersfield Town. He was forced to come off at halftime with concussion.

Oar scored his first goal for Ipswich in a 2–2 draw against Portsmouth in the 2015–16 FA Cup in January 2016.

In January 2016, Ipswich announced that Oar would leave the club by mutual consent after he requested his contract be terminated. Oar played nine matches for Ipswich in all competitions, scoring one goal.

Return to Brisbane Roar
In 2016, Oar rejoined Brisbane Roar on a contract for 2.5 seasons following his stint in England. In February 2017, Oar scored and assisted in a 2–0 victory over Carlos Tevez's Shanghai Shenhua, to qualify for the Asian Champions League.

APOEL FC
Despite signing a marquee contract with Brisbane Roar, Oar joined Cypriot club APOEL in June 2017. Oar made his competitive debut for APOEL in a UEFA Champions League qualifying win over Dudelange on 12 July 2017. During his time with APOEL, Oar was used as a utility player, playing all positions across the midfield and at left back.

Central Coast Mariners
In September 2018, Oar joined Central Coast Mariners on a two year contract. He made his debut against his former club Brisbane Roar in a 1–1 draw. In his second season, Oar was regularly chosen as club captain when regular captain Matt Simon was not on the field. He was also used in a variety of different positions, including midfield, striker, and left back.

Macarthur FC 
On 15 January 2020, Macarthur FC announced Oar as their inaugural signing, starting from the 2020–21 A-League season.  He has predominantly been used as a defensive midfielder during his time at the club. During the 2021/2022 A-League Season, Oar scored two long distance volleys which were both nominated for Goal of the Season. In July 2022, Oar announced his retirement from football.

International career
On 22 December 2009 Oar was named in the Australian national team squad for the 2011 Asian Cup Qualifier against Kuwait but did not receive match time. On 3 March 2010 he made his debut for Australia in a 1–0 win over Indonesia in the final 2011 Asian Cup Qualifier. His performance in this match led to comparisons to Harry Kewell and the potential for Oar to succeed the Australian great.
In August 2011 he played in the U-20 World Cup in Colombia where he scored a 30-yard free kick in the last minute of the game against Ecuador to level 1–1. The goal went on to be voted Goal of the Tournament.
In 2013, Oar scored his first full international goal in a World Cup Qualifier against Japan. The matched finished 1–1, the goal aiding Australia's efforts to qualify for the 2014 World Cup. Oar was later named as part of Australia's 2014 FIFA World Cup squad, where he started and played in all the respective group matches, and later in the 2015 Asian Cup squad.

Career statistics

Club

International

Scores and results lists Australia's goals first, score column indicates score after each Oar goal.

Honours

Club
APOEL
 Cypriot First Division: 2017–18

International
Australia U19
 AFF U-19 Youth Championship: 2008

Australia
 AFC Asian Cup: 2015

Individual
 A-League Young Player of the Year: 2009–10
 PFA A-League Team of the Season: 2009–10
 FFA U20 Footballer of the Year: 2010
 FIFA U-20 World Cup Goal of the Tournament: 2011
 Eredivisie Top 10 Pro Klassement Player of the Year: 2013

References

External links
 
 
 

1991 births
Living people
Association football midfielders
Australia international soccer players
Australia youth international soccer players
Australia under-20 international soccer players
Australian people of Spanish descent
Australian people of Basque descent
Australian soccer players
Brisbane Roar FC players
FC Utrecht players
Ipswich Town F.C. players
APOEL FC players
Central Coast Mariners FC players
Macarthur FC players
A-League Men players
Eredivisie players
Sportspeople from the Gold Coast, Queensland
Soccer players from Queensland
2011 AFC Asian Cup players
2014 FIFA World Cup players
2015 AFC Asian Cup players
Australian expatriate soccer players
Expatriate footballers in the Netherlands
Australian expatriate sportspeople in the Netherlands
Expatriate footballers in England
Australian expatriate sportspeople in England
Expatriate footballers in Cyprus
AFC Asian Cup-winning players
Cypriot First Division players
Marquee players (A-League Men)